Die Nacht der Seele (subtitled "Tantric Songs") is the twelfth album by Popol Vuh. It was originally released in 1979 on Brain Records. In 2005 SPV re-released the album with four bonus tracks. "Engel der Luft" and "Im Reich der Schatten" (slowed down) were used in 1982 for the soundtrack of Werner Herzog's film Fitzcarraldo.

Track listing 
All tracks composed by Florian Fricke except where noted.

 "Mantram der Erdberührung I" – 2:13
 "Engel der Luft" – 2:38
 "Mit Händen, mit Füßen" – 2:42
 "Wo bist Du, der Du überwunden hast?" / "Gesegnet Du, Bei Deiner Ankunft" – 5:41
 "Mantram der Erdberührung II" – 2:12
 "Im Reich der Schatten" (Fricke, Daniel Fichelscher) – 2:10
 "Wanderer durch die Nacht" – 4:07
 "Mantram der Herzberührung I" – 1:48
 "Auf dem Weg" – 2:53
 "Mantram der Herzberührung II" – 1:40
 "In der Halle des Lernens" – 4:02

2005 bonus tracks
All bonus tracks composed by Florian Fricke and Daniel Fichelscher.  
 "Mantram der Stirnberührung I" – 2:16 
 "Zusammenkunft" – 0:47 
 "Mantram der Stirnberührung II" – 2:03 
 "Im Garten der Ruhe (Piano Session Version)" – 10:19

Personnel 
Florian Fricke – piano, vocals
Daniel Fichelscher – guitar, percussion
Djong Yun – vocals
Renate Knaup – vocals

Guest musicians
Susan Goetting – oboe
Alois Gromer – sitar

Credits 
Recorded in 1979 at Bavaria Ton Studios, München and Panne/Paulsen Studio, Frankfurt/Main 
Engineered by Hans Keller, Rudolf Wohlschläger, Eberhard Panne & Robert Wedel 
Produced by Florian Fricke for Gammarock Music 
Executive producer: Gerhard Augustin

External links 

 https://web.archive.org/web/20081029050641/http://www.furious.com/perfect/populvuh.html (Comprehensive article & review of every album, in English)
 https://web.archive.org/web/20080119184752/http://www.enricobassi.it/popvuhdiscografia70.htm (featuring the original credits)
 http://www.venco.com.pl/~acrux/seele.htm

Popol Vuh (band) albums
1979 albums
German-language albums
Brain Records albums
Albums produced by Florian Fricke